Kilolo Kijakazi is an American academic serving as acting commissioner of the Social Security Administration. She was previously appointed deputy commissioner for retirement and disability policy in January 2021, before taking on the top position following Andrew Saul's dismissal on July 9, 2021.

Education
Kijakazi earned a Bachelor of Arts degree from Binghamton University, a Master of Social Work from Howard University, and a PhD in public policy from George Washington University.

Career 
Kijakazi was an institute fellow at the Urban Institute, where she "worked with staff across the organization to develop collaborative partnerships with those most affected by economic and social issues, to expand and strengthen Urban’s agenda of rigorous research, to effectively communicate findings to diverse audiences, and to recruit and retain a diverse research staff at all levels" while conducting research on economic security, structural racism, and the racial wealth gap.

She was previously a program officer at the Ford Foundation, a senior policy analyst at the Center on Budget and Policy Priorities, a program analyst at the Food and Nutrition Service, and a policy analyst at the National Urban League. Prior to entering the Biden administration, she was also a board member of the Winthrop Rockefeller Foundation, the National Academy of Social Insurance, and Liberation in a Generation. She is co-chair of the National Advisory Council on Eliminating the Black-White Wealth Gap at the Center for American Progress and member of the Commission on Retirement Security and Personal Savings at the Bipartisan Policy Center. Kijakazi is the author of African-American Economic Development and Small Business Ownership.

References 

21st-century American non-fiction writers
21st-century American women writers
Biden administration personnel
Binghamton University alumni
Commissioners of the Social Security Administration
George Washington University School of Media and Public Affairs alumni
Howard University alumni
Living people
Urban Institute people
Year of birth missing (living people)